Marjan Strojan (born 16 August 1949) is a Slovene poet, journalist and translator. He studied Comparative literature and Philosophy at the University of Ljubljana and worked as a journalist at the Slovene section of the BBC World Service and as a film critic and literary editor at Radio Slovenija.
He has written a number of volumes of poetry and translated Beowulf, Geoffrey Chaucer's Canterbury Tales, Milton's Paradise Lost and Sonnets as well as poems by William Shakespeare, Robert Frost, James Joyce, Sydney Lea and others into Slovene. He has also edited and in part translated the first comprehensive anthology of English poetry in Slovene. Strojan has written a number of essays, papers and studies on English poetry and contributed to the South Slavic Miltoniana (v. Milton in Translation, OUP, 2016). From 2009 to 2016 he was the president of the Slovenian section of PEN International.

In 2000 he won the Veronika Award for his poetry volume Parniki v dežju (Steamers in the Rain)., in 1995 and 2003 Sovre Translation Awards for Beowulf and Milton's Paradise Lost and the Prešeren Foundation Award for The Canterbury Tales in 2015.

Poetry collections
 Hribi, oblaki, lepo pozdrave (Hills, Clouds, Greetings) 2019
U većernjoj svetlosti (In the Evening Light, tr. by Milan Djordjević) 2018
Pesmi iz iger (Songs from Plays) 2017
Dells and Hollows, tr. by the Author, 2015
V vetru in dežju (In Wind and Rain) 2015
El libro azul y otras poemas, tr. by Teresa Kores 2012
In Ufriendly Weather, Four Slovenian Poets, 2011
Vreme, kamni, krave (Weather, Stones, Cows), 2010
 Pokrajine s senco (Landscapes with Shadows), 2006
 Dan, ko me ljubiš (The Day You Love Me), 2003
 Vyleti do prirody, tr. by František Benhart, 2002
 Parniki v dežju (Steamers in the Rain), 1999
 Drobne nespečnosti (Small Insomnias), 1991
 Izlet v naravo (Excursion into Nature), 1990

References

Slovenian poets
Slovenian male poets
Slovenian journalists
Slovenian translators
Living people
1949 births
Veronika Award laureates
University of Ljubljana alumni
International Writing Program alumni